"The Wind Blows" is a short story by Katherine Mansfield. It was first published in the magazine Signature (4 October 1915) as “Autumns: II” under the pseudonym Matilda Berry. It was published in revised form in the
Athenaeum on 27 August 1920, and subsequently reprinted in Bliss and Other Stories.

Plot summary
Matilda is woken up by the wind; she looks out the window; her neighbour, Marie, is fetching flowers from the garden and then Matilda’s mother is called for the telephone by Bogey, Matilda’s brother. Matilda is off to Mr Bullen's for her music lesson. Her mom does not want her to go due to the strong wind, but she goes anyway. After the lesson, she goes for a walk with her brother to the esplanade.  Here, the story changes from present to past narrative as Mansfield shows that the music lesson, the walk etc. all occurred in Matilda's past, and she and her brother are actually sailing away on board a ship several years down the line, that all that went before were memories.

Characters
Marie Swainson
Bogey
Matilda
Mr Bullen - the character of Mr Bullen is based on the musician Robert Parker

Major themes
 Isolation

Literary significance
The text is written in the modernist mode, without a set structure, and with many shifts in the narrative.

References to other works
Beethoven, Edward Alexander MacDowell and Anton Grigorovich Rubinstein are mentioned.
Marie misquotes Percy Shelley's poem The Clouds.

References

External links
Full text

Modernist short stories
1920 short stories
Short stories by Katherine Mansfield
Works originally published in Athenaeum (British magazine)